Jean Charles Devineau (born 2 August 1979) is a former French footballer and currently the manager of La Roche VF.

Career
Devineau played for FC Nantes, winning the Ligue 1 in 2001 and twice becoming runners-up in the Coupe de France in 1999 and 2000.

International career
Devineau played 3 times for the France national under-21 football team.

Manager career
He became in summer 2011 the job as head coach by SO Cholet at the start of the 2011-2012 season.

Honours

Club
Nantes
 Ligue 1: 2001
 Coupe de France: 1999, 2000
 DH Atlantique: 2009
 Trophée des Champions: 1999

References

1979 births
Living people
People from Cholet
Sportspeople from Maine-et-Loire
Association football central defenders
Association football midfielders
French footballers
FC Nantes players
Stade Lavallois players
SO Cholet players
Ligue 1 players
Ligue 2 players
France under-21 international footballers
Footballers from Pays de la Loire